Boeotarcha taenialis is a moth in the family Crambidae. It was described by Snellen in 1880. It is found on Sulawesi and in Australia, where it has been recorded from the Northern Territory.

The wingspan is about 24 mm. The forewings are pale purplish grey-brown. There is a yellowish-white crossline with a dark brown border. The hindwings are greyish white with a purplish lustre.

References

Moths described in 1880
Odontiinae